Eucalyptus globulus subsp. pseudoglobulus, commonly known as Victorian eurabbie, is one of the four subspecies of Eucalyptus globulus and is endemic to southeastern Australia. It has mostly smooth bark with some persistent slabs of old bark at the base, juvenile leaves with one glaucous side, glossy, lance-shaped adult leaves, pedicellate flower buds in groups of three, white flowers and conical fruit.

Description
The bark is mostly smooth, shedding in long strips to leave a white or greyish surface. There is sometimes rough, partially shed bark at the base of the trunk and ribbons of shedding bark in the upper branches. Young plants and coppice regrowth have stems that are glaucous and more or less square in cross-section, with a prominent wing on each corner.

Flowering has been recorded in February and the flowers are white.

Taxonomy and naming
Victorian eurabbie was first formally described in 1891 by Charles Naudin who gave it the name Eucalyptus globulus var. pseudoglobulus and published the description in his book Description and emploi des Eucalyptus: introduits en Europe principalement en France et en Algerie: second memoire. In 1974, James Barrie Kirkpatrick described four subspecies, including changing the name of E. globulus var. pseudoglobulus to E. globulus subsp. pseudoglobulus.

Distribution and habitat
Victorian eurabbie grows in forest on the slopes of valleys and hills from the Nadgee Nature Reserve in far southeastern New South Wales to the coastal ranges of eastern Gippsland in Victoria.

References

globulus subsp. pseudoglobulus
Myrtales of Australia
Flora of New South Wales
Flora of Victoria (Australia)